A list of episodes of the Chilly Beach series.

Season 1: 2003–2004

Season 2: 2004-2005 
TBD

Season 3: 2005-2006 
TBD

Film: The World is Hot Enough
Dale wonders why no one ever visits Chilly Beach, and realizes that it's due to the cold climate. Thus, Frank invents a super heater to warm Chilly Beach up. When the U.S. learns about it, they steal it and accidentally use it to destroy the planet. Frank and Dale must travel back through time to undo the damage.

Film: The Canadian President 
Following the take-over of Canada by the United States through "asking nicely", Dale is forced into the position of President of the United States by the scheming Hangelberg Group. However, the incompetent Dale proves harder to control than intended, and he and Frank work to defeat the Group's efforts to brainwash all of Canada through micro-chipping.

Lists of Canadian animated television series episodes
Lists of Canadian adult animated television series episodes